David Brooks Fithian (born December 10, 1964) is the president of Clark University. Previously, he served as executive vice president of the University of Chicago. Fithian was born in North Tarrytown, New York.

On January 13, 2020, the trustees of Clark University announced that Fithian would succeed David P. Angel to become the university's 10th president. He began that role July 1, 2020 and is the first alumnus to lead the institution.

Education 
After earning a B.A. degree in sociology from Clark University in 1987, Fithian attended Yale University where he received three graduate degrees (M.A., 1988; M.Phil, 1990; Ph.D., 1994, with highest honors) in sociology. Fithian's doctoral dissertation, for which he was advised by Kai Erikson, was awarded Yale's Theron Rockwell Field Prize in May 1994.

Career 

Following graduate training, Fithian began his professional career as Assistant Dean of Freshmen in Harvard College in 1995 and spent more than a decade there in progressively more senior positions culminating in the role of associate dean of the Faculty of Arts and Sciences before leaving Harvard in 2007 for the University of Chicago. At UChicago, Fithian served as vice president and Secretary of the University until March 2014 when he became Executive Vice President.

While at Harvard, Fithian taught courses for a number of years for the Committee on Degrees in Social Studies.

Other Interests 

Fithian currently serves as a Trustee of the Marine Biological Laboratory (2014–present) in Woods Hole, Massachusetts, and previously served on the boards of Chapin Hall (2013-2019) and Court Theatre (2011-2014) at the University of Chicago.

References 

1964 births
Living people
People from Tarrytown, New York
Clark University alumni
Yale Graduate School of Arts and Sciences alumni
University of Chicago people
Presidents of Clark University